Adorable Monica is a Venezuelan telenovela produced by Venevisión in 1990 and distributed internationally by Venevisión International. The telenovela is written by Ana Mercedes Escámez and Milagros del Valle, based on Delia Fiallo's La heredera, and starred Emma Rabbe and Guillermo Dávila as the main protagonists with Mirla Castellanos as the main antagonist.

Synopsis
Monica Suárez is a humble girl from the provinces forced to live tough life in the capital where she must confront the purest and most terrible passions present in the world. She comes across an accidental father, a devious aunt, a faithful friend, a fight for an inheritance and a young, obsessive attorney, Luis Alfredo, and his musician twin brother, thus forming suspense and intrigue.

Cast

See also
List of famous telenovelas
List of programs broadcast by Venevision
List of telenovelas of Venevisión

References

External links
Adorable Monica at the Internet Movie Database
Opening Credits 

1990 telenovelas
Venevisión telenovelas
1990 Venezuelan television series debuts
1990 Venezuelan television series endings
Venezuelan telenovelas
Spanish-language telenovelas
Television shows set in Caracas